Japanese calendar types have included a range of official and unofficial systems. At present, Japan uses the Gregorian calendar together with year designations stating the year of the reign of the current Emperor. The written form starts with the year, then the month and finally the day, coinciding with the ISO 8601 standard. For example, February 16, 2003, can be written as either 2003年2月16日 or 平成15年2月16日 (the latter following the regnal year system). 年 reads nen and means "year", 月 reads gatsu (がつ) and means "month" and finally 日 (usually) reads nichi (its pronunciation depends on the number that precedes it, see below) and means "day".

Prior to the introduction of the Gregorian calendar in 1873, the reference calendar was based on the lunisolar Chinese calendar.

History

In the 21st century, however, the era system (gengo) and Western system (seireki) are the only ones still widely used.

Chinese Calendar

The lunisolar Chinese calendar was introduced to Japan via Korea in the middle of the sixth century. After that, Japan calculated its calendar using various Chinese calendar procedures, and from 1685, using Japanese variations of the Chinese procedures.  Its sexagenary cycle was often used together with era names, as in the 1729 Ise calendar shown above, which is for "the 14th year of Kyōhō, tsuchi-no-to no tori", i.e., .

In modern times, the old Chinese calendar is virtually ignored; celebrations of the Lunar New Year are thus limited to Chinese and other Asian immigrant communities. However, its influence can still be felt in the idea of "lucky and unlucky days" (described below), the traditional meanings behind the name of each month, and other features of modern Japanese calendars.

Era Names (gengō)

The  system (or, strictly speaking) was also introduced from China, and has been in continuous use since AD 701. The reigning Emperor chooses the name associated with their regnal eras; before 1868, multiple names were chosen throughout the same emperor's rule, such as to commemmorate a major event. For instance, the Emperor Kōmei's reign (1846–1867) was split into seven eras, one of which lasted only one year. Starting with Kōmei's grandson the Emperor Taishō in 1912, there has only been one gengō per emperor representing their entire reign.    

The nengō system remains in wide use, especially on official documents and government forms. It is also in general use in private and personal business.

The present era, Reiwa, formally began on 1 May 2019.  The name of the new era was announced by the Japanese government on 1 April 2019, a month prior to Naruhito's succession to the throne. The previous era, Heisei, came to an end on 30 April 2019, after Japan's former emperor, Akihito, abdicated the throne. Reiwa is the first era name whose characters come from a Japanese root source; prior eras' names were taken from Chinese classic literature.

Japanese Imperial Years (kōki or kigen)

The  is based on the date of the legendary founding of Japan by Emperor Jimmu in 660 BC. For instance, 600 BC is counted as Kōki1. 

It was first used in the official calendar in 1873. Kōki 2600 (1940) was a special year. The 1940 Summer Olympics and Tokyo Expo were planned as anniversary events, but were canceled due to the Second Sino-Japanese War. The Japanese naval Zero Fighter was named after this year. After the Second World War , the United States occupied Japan, and stopped the use of kōki by officials. 

Today, kōki is rarely used, except in some judicial contexts. Usage of kōki dating can be a nationalist signal, pointing out that the history of Japan's imperial family is longer than that of Christianity, the basis of the Anno Domini (AD) system.

The 1898 law determining the placement of leap years is officially based on the kōki years, using a formula that is effectively equivalent to that of the Gregorian calendar: if the kōki year number is evenly divisible by four, it is a leap year, unless the number minus 660 is evenly divisible by 100 and not by 400.  Thus, for example, the year Kōki 2560 (AD 1900) is divisible by 4; but 2560 − 660 = 1900, which is evenly divisible by 100 and not by 400, so kōki 2560 was not a leap year, just as in most of the rest of the world.

Gregorian Calendar (seireki)

The  system, based on the solar Gregorian calendar, was first introduced in 1873 as part of the Japan's Meiji period modernization.  

Nowadays, Japanese people know it as well as the regnal eras.

Divisions of Time

Seasons

There are four seasons corresponding to the West's:

However, there is also a traditional system of 72 seasons, with 24 divisions each divided into three sets of five days, and with specially-named days or  indicating the start and end of each. This system was adapted from the Chinese in 1685 by court astronomer Shibukawa Shunkai, rewriting the names to better match the local climate and nature in his native Japan. Each ko has traditional customs, festivals, foods, flowers and birds associated with it. One can nowadays download an app to learn about and follow along with these "micro-seasons," listed below:

The 24 sekki

Zassetsu
 is a collective term for special seasonal days within the 24 sekki. 

Shanichi dates can vary by as much as 5 days.
Chūgen has a fixed day. All other days can vary by one day.

Many zassetsu days occur in multiple seasons:
  refers to the 18 days before each season, especially the one before fall which is known as the hottest period of a year.
  is the seven middle days of spring and autumn, with Shunbun at the middle of the seven days for spring, Shūbun for fall.
  is the  day closest to Shunbun (middle of spring) or Shūbun (middle of fall), which can be as much as 5 days before to 4 days after Shunbun/Shūbun.

Months

As mentioned above, the Japanese calendar used to be based on an adaptation of the Chinese lunar calendar, which begins 3 to 7 weeks later than the Gregorian. In other words, the Gregorian "first month" and the Chinese "first month" do not align, which is important in historical contexts.

The "traditional names" for each month, shown below, are still used by some in fields such as poetry; of the twelve, Shiwasu is still widely used today. The opening paragraph of a letter or the greeting in a speech might borrow one of these names to convey a sense of the season. Some, such as Yayoi and Satsuki, do double duty as given names (for women). These month names also appear from time to time on jidaigeki, contemporary television shows and movies set in the Edo period or earlier.

The Japanese names for the modern Gregorian months literally translate to "first month", "second month", and so on. The corresponding number is combined with the suffix  (-gatsu, "month"). The table below uses traditional numerals, but the use of Western numerals (etc.) is common.

Division of the Month

Week

Japan uses a seven-day week, aligned with the Western calendar. The seven-day week, with names for the days corresponding to the Latin system, was brought to Japan around AD 800 with the Buddhist calendar. The system was used for astrological purposes and little else until 1876.

Much like in multiple European languages, in which the names for weekdays are, partially or fully, based on what the Ancient Romans considered the seven visible planets, meaning the five visible planets and the sun and the moon, in The Far East the five visible planets are named after the five Chinese elements (metal, wood, water, fire, earth.) On the origin of the names of the days of the week, also see East Asian Seven Luminaries.

* For those wondering, the Sun is 太陽 (great yang) and the Moon is 太陰 (great yin) 

Sunday and Saturday are regarded as "Western style take-a-rest days". These holidays have no religious meaning (except those who believe in Christianity or Judaism). Many Japanese retailers do not close on Saturdays or Sundays, because many office workers and their families are expected to visit the shops during the weekend. An old Imperial Japanese Navy song says "Mon Mon Tue Wed Thu Fri Fri!" which means "We work throughout the entire week."

10-Days (jun)

Japanese people also use 10-day periods called . Each month is divided into two 10-day periods and a third with the remaining 8 to 11 days:
 The first (from the 1st to the 10th) is 
 The second (from the 11th to the 20th), 
 The last (from the 21st to the end of the month), .

These are frequently used to indicate approximate times, for example, "the temperatures are typical of the jōjun of April"; "a vote on a bill is expected during the gejun of this month." The magazine Kinema Junpo was originally published once every jun (i.e. three times a month).

Days

The table below shows dates written with traditional numerals, but use of Arabic numerals (etc.) is extremely common in everyday communication, almost the norm.

Each day of the month has a semi-systematic name. The days generally use kun (native Japanese) numeral readings up to ten, and thereafter on (Chinese-derived) readings, but there are some irregularities. 

Tsuitachi is a worn-down form of tsuki-tachi, which means "the month beginning". The last day of the month was called tsugomori, which means "Moon hidden". This classical word comes from the tradition of the lunisolar calendar.

The 30th was also called misoka, just as the 20th is called hatsuka. Nowadays, the terms for the numbers 28–31 plus nichi are much more common. However, misoka is much used in contracts, etc., specifying that a payment should be made on or by the last day of the month, whatever the number is.

As mentioned below, there is traditional belief that some days are lucky (kichijitsu) or unlucky. For example, there are some who will avoid beginning something on an unlucky day.

Holidays and Other Notable Days

April 1
The first day of April has broad significance in Japan. It marks the beginning of the government's fiscal year. Many corporations follow suit. In addition, corporations often form or merge on that date. In recent years, municipalities have preferred it for mergers. On this date, many new employees begin their jobs, and it is the start of many real-estate leases. The school year begins on April 1.

Rokuyō
The  are a series of six days calculated from the date of Chinese calendar that supposedly predict whether there will be good or bad fortune during that day. The rokuyō are commonly found on Japanese calendars and are often used to plan weddings and funerals, though most people ignore them in ordinary life. In order, they are:

The rokuyō days are easily calculated from the Japanese lunisolar calendar. The first day of the first month is always senshō, with the days following in the order given above until the end of the month. Thus, the 2nd day is tomobiki, the 3rd is senbu, and so on. The 1st day of the 2nd month restarts the sequence at tomobiki. The 3rd month restarts at senbu, and so on for each month. The latter six months repeat the patterns of the first six, so the 1st of the 7th is senshō, the 1st of the 12th is shakkō and the moon-viewing day on the 15th of the 8th is always butsumetsu. 

This system did not become popular in Japan until the end of the Edo period.

National Holidays

After World War II, the names of Japanese national holidays were completely changed because of the secular state principle (Article 20, The Constitution of Japan). Although many of them actually originated from Shinto, Buddhism and important events relating to the Japanese imperial family, it is not easy to understand the original meanings from the superficial and vague official names.

Notes: Single days between two national holidays are taken as a bank holiday. This applies to May 4, which is a holiday each year. When a national holiday falls on a Sunday the next day that is not a holiday (usually a Monday) is taken as a holiday.

† Traditional date on which according to legend Emperor Jimmu founded Japan in 660 BC.

* Part of Golden Week.

Timeline of Creation of and Changes to National Holidays 

 1948: The following national holidays were introduced in the : New Year's Day, Coming-of-Age Day, Constitution Memorial Day, Children's Day, Autumnal Equinox Day, Culture Day, and Labor Thanksgiving Day.
 1966: A supplementary provision to create Health and Sports Day was introduced in memory of the 1964 Tokyo Olympics. Vernal Equinox Day, National Foundation Day and Respect for the Aged Day were also introduced.
 1989: After the Shōwa Emperor died on January 7, his birthday, April 29, was renamed Greenery Day and The Emperor's Birthday (observed as a national holiday since 1868) moved to December 23 for the succeeding Akihito.
 1995: Reform to the national holiday law added Marine Day, to be celebrated July 20.
 2000, 2003:  moved several holidays to Monday. Starting with 2000: Coming-of-Age Day (formerly January 15, now the second Monday in January) and Health and Sports Day (formerly October 10, now the second Monday in October). Starting with 2003: Marine Day (formerly July 20, now the third Monday in July) and Respect for the Aged Day (formerly September 15, now the third Monday in September).
 2014: Mountain Day was established as a new holiday, to be observed starting 2016
 2019: Akihito's birthday is December 23rd; however, he abdicated April 30, 2019, in favor of his son Naruhito, which moved the "Emperor's Birthday" holiday to February 23rd. Because the transition happened before Akihito's birthday but after Naruhito's, the "Emperor's Birthday" holiday was not celebrated that year.
 2020: The speech given by Naruhito during the New Year was the first given since 2017, when Akihito halted the practice to reduce his workload.
 2021, 2022: Because of the COVID-19 crisis, Naruhito's  New Year's greetings were delivered via a televised speech instead of in-person.
 2023: The imperial family's New Year's greetings were held publicly for the first time in three years. The Emperor's Birthday on February 23 will also be the first time public celebrations will be held for the occasion since Naruhito's ascension in 2019. The latter events in 2020, 2021 and 2022 had all been cancelled due to concerns over COVID-19.

Seasonal Festivals
The following are known as the five seasonal festivals ( sekku, also  gosekku). The sekku were made official holidays during Edo period on Chinese lunisolar calendar. The dates of these festivals are confused nowadays; some on the Gregorian calendar, others on "Tsuki-okure".

 7th day of the 1st month:  (Jinjitsu),  (Nanakusa no sekku) held on 7 January 
 3rd day of the 3rd month:  (Jōshi),  (Momo no sekku) held on 3 March in many areas, but in some area on 3 April
  (Hina matsuri), Girls' Day.
 5th day of the 5th month: Tango: mostly held on 5 May
  (Tango no sekku),  (Ayame no sekku)
 Boys' Day. Overlaps with the national holiday Children's Day.
 7th day of the 7th month:  (Shichiseki, Tanabata),  (Hoshi matsuri ) held on 7 July in many areas, but in northern Japan held on 7 August (e.g. in Sendai)
 9th day of the 9th month:  (Chōyō),  (Kiku no sekku) almost out of vogue today

Not sekku:
 January 1: Japanese New Year
 August 15: Obon – the date is "Tsuki-okure". In central Tokyo Obon is held on July 15 (The local culture of Tokyo tends to dislike Tsuki-okure custom.)
 December 31: Ōmisoka

Customary issues in modern Japan

Gregorian months and the "One-Month Delay"
In contrast to other East Asian countries such as China, Vietnam, Korea and Mongolia, Japan has almost completely forgotten the Chinese calendar. Since 1876, January has been officially regarded as the "first month" even when setting the date of Japanese traditional folklore events (other months are the same: February as the second month, March as the third, and so on). But this system often brings a strong seasonal sense of gap since the event is 3 to 7 weeks earlier than in the traditional calendar. Modern Japanese culture has invented a kind of "compromised" way of setting dates for festivals called Tsuki-okure ("One-Month Delay") or Chūreki ("The Eclectic Calendar").
The festival is celebrated just one solar calendar month later than the date on the Gregorian calendar. For example, the Buddhist festival of Obon was the 15th day of the 7th month. Many places the religious services are held on July 15. However, in some areas, the rites are normally held on August 15, which is more seasonally close to the old calendar. (The general term "Obon holiday" always refers to the middle of August.) Although this is just de facto and customary, it is broadly used when setting the dates of many folklore events and religious festivals. But Japanese New Year is the great exception. The date of Japanese New Year is always January 1.

See also
 East Asian age reckoning
 Jikkan Jūnishi
 List of kigo
 Japanese festivals

References

External links

Rokuyo – Lucky and Unlucky Days of the Japanese Calendar in Japanese
 National Diet Library, "The Japanese Calendar"
The Lunar Calendar in Japan

Modified Gregorian calendars
Specific calendars
1873 disestablishments in Japan